Franco Rosso (29 August 1941 – 9 December 2016) was an Italian-born film producer and director based in England. He is known for making films about Black British culture, and in particular for the 1980 cult film Babylon, about Black Jamaican youth in south London, which was backed by the National Film Finance Corporation.

Life and career
Rosso was born in Turin, Piedmont, Italy, but grew up in London, where his parents (who had been Fiat workers in Turin) brought him when he was aged eight. After attending comprehensive school in Battersea, Rosso went on to Camberwell School of Art and the Royal College of Art (at which he was a contemporary of Ian Dury).

He was assistant on Ken Loach's 1969 film Kes, and Rosso's subsequent career as a filmmaker encompassed feature films, as well as television documentaries and series, working as an editor, producer, director and writer. Following early productions at the Royal College of Art, Rosso made his notable directorial debut with the documentary  The Mangrove Nine, about the resistance to police attacks on the popular Mangrove restaurant in the early 1970s, scripted by John La Rose and narrated by Andrew Salkey. According to Martin Stellman's obituary of Rosso, The Mangrove Nine film was "so uncompromising in its portrayal of police racism that the BBC delayed its transmission. For several years afterwards, Rosso could not get work with the corporation and firmly believed he had been blacklisted."

In 1981, Rosso won an Evening Standard Award for Most Promising Film-Maker for his drama Babylon, which was called by New Britain fanzine "one of the best British films ever made, not just one of the best 'Black' or 'Youth' films".

Selected filmography
 1967: Rainbows Are Insured against Old Age – Royal College of Art (director)
 1968: Dream Weaver – Royal College of Art (director)
 1973: The Mangrove Nine — documentary about the Mangrove Nine (director; co-producer Horace Ové, scripted by John La Rose)
 1979: Dread Beat an' Blood — documentary for Omnibus (BBC television), featuring Linton Kwesi Johnson (director)
 1980: Babylon — drama (director, writer)
 1983: Ian Dury – biopic (director)
 1983: Salt on a Snake's Tail – BBC TV (director)
 1984: The Caribbean in Crisis: The West Indies One Year after the Grenada Invasion – documentary for Channel Four (producer)
 1985: Sixty-Four Day Hero: A Boxer's Tale (director)
 1986: Struggle for Stonebridge — documentary for 40 Minutes, BBC Two (director)
 1988: The Nature of the Beast (director)
 1991: Lucha Libre — for television (director)
 1995: Money Drugs Lock-up (director)

References

External links
 

1941 births
2016 deaths
Alumni of Camberwell College of Arts
Alumni of the Royal College of Art
British film directors
Film people from London
Italian emigrants to the United Kingdom
Italian film directors